Castanopsis buruana is a tree in the family Fagaceae. The specific epithet  is from the Latin, meaning "of Buru" (one of Indonesia's Maluku Islands).

Description
The brown bark is smooth or scaly.

Distribution and habitat
Castanopsis buruana grows naturally in Borneo, Sulawesi and Maluku. Its habitat is dipterocarp forests from sea-level to  altitude.

References

buruana
Trees of Borneo
Trees of Sulawesi
Trees of the Maluku Islands
Plants described in 1863
Taxa named by Friedrich Anton Wilhelm Miquel
Flora of the Borneo lowland rain forests